The Giant Runt is a breed of pigeon developed by selective breeding primarily as a utility and exhibition breed. American Giant Runts, along with other varieties of the domestic pigeon, are all descendants from the rock pigeon (Columbia livia).
The breed is known for its large size and suitability for squab production.

Origin
The Giant Runt was developed by crossing the original Runt with several other varieties. The American Giant Runt was the result of US breeders seeking a wider, more compact bird denoting power and body mass. A related breed is the American Giant Rumbler which is a further development. Both varieties are recognized in the United States and India.

See also 
List of pigeon breeds

References

External links
Giant Runt Pigeon: Breed Guide Pigeonpedia.com

Pigeon breeds originating in the United States
Pigeon breeds